The International Federation of Muaythai Associations, or IFMA, called the International Federation of Muaythai Amateur until 27 July 2019, is the sole recognised sport governing body of amateur and professional Muay Thai and Muay boran consisting of 140 member countries worldwide with 5 continental federations after unification of International Federation of Muaythai Amateur and World Muaythai Council. IFMA is officially recognised by the International Olympic Committee (IOC), the Global Association of International Sports Federations (GAISF), the Association of IOC Recognised International Sports Federations (ARISF), the Olympic Council of Asia (OCA), World Anti-Doping Agency (WADA) International World Games Association (IWGA), and Trim and Fitness International Sport for All Association (TAFISA). Muaythai has been included in many official sport programs such as the World Games, World Combat Games, Arafura Games, TAFISA Games, SEA Games, Asian Indoor and Martial Arts Games, Asian Beach Games, Demonstration Sport in the Asian Games.

History
The International Federation of Muaythai Associations (IFMA) was officially inaugurated in 1993 as the International Federation of Muaythai Amateur, a small federation with several enthusiastic member countries. IFMA has grown to 128 member countries worldwide with 5 continental federations under a single, unified regulatory body. In 1998, IFMA was formally recognized by the Olympic Council of Asia.
IFMA's objective is the total unification of all 128 member national federations, working mutually for the sport and the athletes. The enthusiasm and commitment of the members, boxers and officials is one of the greatest assets that IFMA brings to the ancient sport of Muaythai.

At the IFMA Royal World Cup in Bangkok the AIMS conference took place gathering all 23 presidents from its members as well as representatives of IOC, FISU, IWGA, Peace and Sport, TAFISA and many others.  The 2015 IFMA Royal World Cup displayed the rapid popularity of women competing in muaythai as the stadium quickly reached capacity during female bouts that displayed courage and heart. 93 countries participated in this event.

In December 2015 AIMS received provisional recognition by the IOC. The following year in December 2016 at the annual meeting of the IOC Executive Board, Muaythai with IFMA as the governing body, was granted provisional IOC recognition for a period of three years. This allows IFMA to receive funding from the IOC and apply for development programmes.

Timeline

Some of IFMA's milestones:
 2005 – Inclusion in the Southeast Asian Games (SEA Games) as a fully recognised medal sport.
 2005 – Inclusion in the Asian Indoor Games (AIG).
 2006 – Recognition from the Global Association of International Sports Federations (GAISF).
 2008 – Inclusion in the Trim and Fitness International Sport for All Association (TAFISA) Games and as a full member of the TAFISA Sport for All Organization.
 2008 – Inclusion in the Arafura Games.
 2009 – Inclusion in the Asian Martial Arts Games (AMAG).
 2010 – Inclusion in the GAISF World Combat Games.
 2013 – Inclusion in the International World Games Association (IWGA)
 2013 – Inclusion in the Asian Indoor and Martial Arts Games (AIMAG).
 2014 – Inclusion in the Asian Beach Games.
 2015 – International University Sports Federation (FISU) gives its patronage for University Muaythai Cup.
 2015 – International University Sports Federation (FISU) has officially recognised muaythai signing the agreement between FISU and IFMA.
 2016 – Provisional recognition from the International Olympic Committee.
 2019 – Fully recognition from the International Olympic Committee.
 2019 – Unification with World Muaythai Council (WMC) and rebranded to International Federation of Muaythai Associations (IFMA).

IOC recognition

On December 6, 2016, the IOC Executive Board had provisionally recognised muaythai following an executive board meeting in Lausanne, Switzerland.

Governance

Executive committee

President’s Advisory Council

Commissions

Area associations
International Federation of Muaythai Associations has a total of 122 member federations divided into 5 area associations.

 EMF – European Muaythai Federation in Europe
 FAMA – Federation of Asian Muaythai Associations in Asia
 Africa
 OMF – Oceania Muaythai Federation in Oceania
 PAMU – Pan-American Muaythai Union in the Americas

Events

International

Continental

Professional rankings

Men's divisions

Women's divisions

Criticism
The Ukrainian and Finnish national teams boycotted the 2022 IFMA youth world championships held in Malaysia due to IFMA reversing their decision of not allowing the Russian and Belarusian national teams to participate in the competition.

References

External links

 Official IFMA site

 
Amateur Muay Thai organizations
Professional Muay Thai organizations
Organizations based in Bangkok
Sports organizations established in 1993
1993 establishments in Thailand
Muaythai
Sports governing bodies in Thailand
International organizations based in Thailand
Muay
Sports world rankings